The Labora Fontbernat M-1938 was a Submachine gun of Catalan origin and was used by the Spanish Republican Army during the Spanish Civil War. It was made from machined steel and chambered in the 9x23mm Largo round.

Users

References

http://www.securityarms.com/20010315/galleryfiles/3200/3258.htm
https://web.archive.org/web/20121011170743/http://www.tv3.cat/industriadeguerra/arma_3.html
https://web.archive.org/web/20090614044054/http://www.ejercito.mde.es/Unidades/es/unidades/Madrid/ihycm/Museos/barcelona/mmm_piezas_04.html
http://industriesdeguerra.blogspot.com/2005_07_01_archive.html

External links
https://web.archive.org/web/20100414000109/http://world.guns.ru/smg/smg133-e.htm
https://www.europeana.eu/it/item/08641/1037479000000476595

Submachine guns of Spain
Military history of Catalonia